Mercyhealth is a non-profit health care system based in Rockford, Illinois. It is a regional health care system with over 85 facilities serving a total of 55 communities throughout southern Wisconsin and northern Illinois. As part of its diversified, vertically integrated system, Mercyhealth operates over four core service areas: hospital-based services; clinic-based services; post-acute care and retail services; and a wholly owned and operated insurance company, MercyCare Health Plans.

History 

The original Janesville City Hospital was founded in 1883 by Dr. Henry Palmer, a Civil War surgeon general who had trained Daniel Hale Williams, an African American surgeon who, in 1893, was the first physician to successfully perform an open heart surgery. Dr. Williams spent two years as an apprentice to Dr. Henry Palmer. The hospital was later renamed Palmer Memorial Hospital and was operated by his son Dr. William Palmer. Soon after it was bought by the Sisters of Mercy of Chicago who renamed it Palmer Memorial Mercy Hospital. The Mercy Sisters worked as trained nurses during the Civil War, and after the war they took on the work of public health care. Need for expansion led to the Sisters of Mercy opening a 50-bed Mercy Hospital facility in Janesville in 1913, which eventually grew through renovation into a 150-bed facility by 1920.

In the second half of the 20th century the Sisters of Mercy began to divest itself of its health care holdings, including the Janesville hospital, and Mercy became an independent organization. At that same time, Mercyhealth grew out of their old hospital and built a 275-bed facility in downtown Janesville, WI. This facility is the current site of Mercyhealth Hospital and Trauma Center.

In 1989, Mercyhealth's volunteer board of directors selected Javon R. Bea as its president and CEO. When Bea became CEO, Mercyhealth could only claim $33 million in annual revenue, had only 589 total employees in a single hospital location, and only saw an estimated 89,000 patients yearly. As of 2020,  Mercyhealth sees an average of 1.2 million patients every year, employs over 6,750 people across 85 locations, and can claim $1.3 billion in annual revenue.

Rockford Hospital opened in 1855 and was the city's first hospital. By 1913, the hospital outgrew its 11-patient capacity in a made-over home at South Court and Chestnut streets, and a 30-patient hospital was built, with the hospital's name being changed to Rockford Memorial Hospital in 1942. The Court-Chestnut location would serve the area until July 1954, when a new building was constructed on North Rockton Avenue.

On October 23, 2014, the boards of Rockford Health System and Mercy Health System agreed to a merger.

The merged system includes five hospitals, more than 600 physicians and 85 outpatient and specialty care clinics in Illinois and Wisconsin. In September 2018, they announced the opening of a new hospital in Rockford specializing in the health of women and children called Mercyhealth's Javon Bea Hospital and Physician Clinic–Riverside, a $505 million complex. In addition, the hospital on the Mercyhealth Rockton Avenue Campus (formerly Rockford Memorial) was renamed to Javon Bea Hospital.

Recent events 
In 2022, Mercyhealth announced a partnership with Blackhawk Technical College in Janesville, WI to assist students going into health care by offering five full-ride scholarships.

In 2021, Mercyhealth broke ground on the new Mercyhealth Hospital and Medical Center–Crystal Lake, a $105 million new facility opening in July 2023.

In 2021, Mercyhealth began construction on the Michael Berry Building on the Janesville Campus. A newly constructed third floor will include a 12,000 square-foot Kidney Care and Dialysis Center with twice the number of treatment chairs. The new space is expected to open summer 2023.

In 2021, Mercyhealth Javon Bea Hospital–Rockton transitioned to a standby emergency department. The decision came after extensive evaluation of the needs and utilization of the Rockton Avenue campus. The review showed the majority of patients accessing the emergency department did not need emergency care and could be treated at an urgent care facility.

In June 2020, Mercyhealth announced the closure of the Pediatric Intensive Care Unit, which was only lightly used. The following month, the inpatient acute mental illness closed for similar reasons. Outpatient mental health services continue to be offered.

On April 22, 2020, Mercyhealth announced that the health system was terminating contracts with IlliniCare, Meridian, Molina, and Blue Cross Blue Shield Medicaid due financial difficulties from the COVID pandemic and a reduction in income from Medicaid and other health insurance providers.

On March 23, 2020, Mercyhealth announced unpaid furloughs to an undisclosed number of employees due to the COVID pandemic. Mercyhealth then reduced salaries for employees in leadership positions and physicians system-wide. This included the President and CEO, Javon Bea. In 2018, Javon Bea's salary was $9.36 million.

In 2019, Mercyhealth opened Javon Bea Hospital and Physician Clinic–Riverside, a $505 million new facility.

Education Programs 
Mercyhealth is dedicated to training the next generation of health care professionals and offers an extensive amount of health care classes, fellowships and residencies including:

Administrative fellowship program
Emergency services training
Family medicine residency programs in Janesville and Rockford
GI fellowship program
Hospitalist fellowship program
Internal medicine residency program
Nurse residency program
School of radiography
School of sonography
Sports medicine fellowship programs

Recognition 
Mercyhealth has received many awards for health care excellence, work place culture, organizational leadership, community outreach and more including:

Magnet recognition from the American Nurses Credentialing Center
Beacon Award of Excellence from the American Association of Critical Care Nurses
Five-star quality ranking from the federal Centers for Medicare and Medicaid
Strategic Healthcare Programs' Best Superior Performer Award for patient satisfaction
A Best Hospital in Wisconsin by U.S. News & World Report
Best Superior Performer Award for Patient Satisfaction from Strategic Healthcare Programs
A Best Nursing Homes Illinois by U.S. News & World Report
University of Wisconsin Organ and Tissue Donation Award of Hope
National Committee for Quality Assurance 4 out of 5 star rating for reporting Healthcare Effectiveness Data and Information Set
American Hospital Association Dick Davidson NOVA award for the House of Mercy Homeless Center
Global Excellence Award from Wisconsin Hospital Association for the House of Mercy Homeless Center
Multiple time winner for Wisconsin Hospital Association's Wisconsin Award for Volunteer Excellence
Partner of the Year Award from Wisconsin Association of Free and Charitable Clinics for partnership with HealthNet of Rock County
The Mercyhealth Care Center was named among the “Best Nursing Homes” in the country by US News & World Report.
Javon Bea Hospital–Riverside was recognized for its dedication to heart patients by the American College of Cardiology (ACC) in the "Best Hospitals" issue of US News & World Report.
Javon Bea Hospital–Rockton Sub-Acute Unit in Rockford, IL was named among the “Best Nursing Homes” in the country by U.S. News & World Report.

Accreditations and Certifications 
Javon Bea Hospital–Riverside was recognized for its dedication to heart patients by the American College of Cardiology (ACC) in the "Best Hospitals" issue of US News & World Report.

Mercyhealth's clinical breast program in Rockford was granted a 3-year, full accreditation from the National Accreditation Program for Breast Centers.

Mercyhealth Hospital and Trauma Center–Janesville and Mercyhealth Hospital and Medical Center–Walworth were both awarded Chest Pain Center accreditation based on onsite evaluation.

Mercyhealth's Javon Bea Hospital–Riverside received certification as a Comprehensive Stroke Center, which is the highest level achievable in the health care industry.

Facilities

Acute-care hospitals 
 Javon Bea Hospital–Rockton, (formerly Rockford Memorial Hospital), Rockford, Illinois (307 beds)
 Mercyhealth Hospital and Trauma Center–Janesville, Janesville, Wisconsin (223 beds)
 Javon Bea Hospital–Riverside, Rockford, Illinois (188 bed) 
 Van Matre Encompass Health Rehabilitation Hospital, Rockford, Illinois (65 beds)
 Mercyhealth Hospital and Medical Center–Walworth, Lake Geneva, Wisconsin (25 beds)
 Mercyhealth Hospital and Medical Center–Harvard, Harvard, Illinois (26 beds)
 Mercyhealth Hospital and Medical Center–Crystal Lake, Crystal Lake, Illinois (13 beds) Opening in 2023.

Medical and specialty centers 
In addition to their main hospitals and clinics, Mercyhealth operates over 65 different medical and specialty centers throughout their service area. Some of these locations include heart and vascular centers, cancer centers, neurosurgery center, neonatal intensive care unit, men's and women's health centers, pharmacies, several vision centers, two thrift stores, and a 30-bed homeless shelter. Services also include home health, hospice and medical equipment and supplies.

Locations:

Wisconsin
 Beloit, Wisconsin
 Brodhead, Wisconsin
 Delavan, Wisconsin
 Edgerton, Wisconsin
 Elkhorn, Wisconsin
 Evansville, Wisconsin
 Janesville, Wisconsin
 Lake Geneva, Wisconsin
 Milton, Wisconsin
 Sharon, Wisconsin
 Whitewater, Wisconsin
Illinois
 Algonquin, Illinois
 Barrington, Illinois
 Belvidere, Illinois
 Byron, Illinois
 Crystal Lake, Illinois
 Harvard, Illinois
 Lake in the Hills, Illinois
 Loves Park, Illinois
 Machesney Park, Illinois
 McHenry, Illinois
 Richmond, Illinois
 Rockford, Illinois
 Roscoe, Illinois
 Winnebago, Illinois 
 Woodstock, Illinois

References

External links 
 

Hospital networks in the United States
Healthcare in Illinois
Healthcare in Wisconsin
Janesville, Wisconsin
McHenry County, Illinois
Medical and health organizations based in Wisconsin
1883 establishments in Wisconsin